Hyposmocoma aumakuawai is a species of moth of the family Cosmopterigidae. It is endemic to Kauai. The species belongs to the amphibious caterpillar guild of the genus Hyposmocoma.

References

aumakuawai
Endemic moths of Hawaii
Moths described in 2011